Charalampos 'Charis' Sarafoglou (born 2 January 1993) is a Greek footballer who plays for Thermaikos Thermis in the Greek Football League 2 as a winger and offensive midfielder. He has also played for Iraklis in the first division Superleague and second division Football League.

Career
Sarafoglou is a product of Iraklis' academies. Sarafoglou was a member of the squad of Iraklis which took part in the regional championship of Delta Ethniki, after being expelled from the professional leagues. He made his first team debut in Iraklis' away draw against Nea Kallikrateia. He also captained the team during that season. He made his professional debut for Iraklis on 12 November 2012, in an away draw against Apollon Smyrni in the 2012-13 season. His first goal for the club was a late equaliser against Panserraikos. On 6 August Sarafoglou signed for Iraklis Ambelokipi. He debuted for his new club on 21 September 2014, in an away match against Orfeas Elefteroupoli.

References

External links 
 profile in Iraklis' Official site

Living people
1993 births
Greek footballers
Iraklis Thessaloniki F.C. players
Association football wingers